Ekrokpe is a town in Ughelli South Local Government Area of Delta State, Nigeria.

References

Populated places in Delta State